Prameela (T. A. Prameela) is a veteran Indian actress in South Indian films. She was a prominent lead actress during the 1970s and 1980s in Malayalam and Tamil films also acted in few Kannada and Telugu films as well. She was noted for her glamorous roles. She has acted more than 50 Malayalam movies. She made her debut through 1968 Malayalam movie "Inspector". She got her major breakthrough in the 1973 Tamil film Arangetram. She is married to an American and settled in Los Angeles, California. She is a Roman Catholic and her mother tongue is Tamil.

Personal life 
She was born to Amal Das and Susheela as the second daughter among four children at Tiruchirappalli, Tamil Nadu. She has an elder brother Caesar, a younger sister, Sweety and a younger brother Prabhu. The family shifted to Chennai for her film career. She did her primary education at Sharada Vidyalaya, Chennai. She debuted at the age of 12 in the movie Inspector released in 1968. She acted around 250 movies in the four South Indian languages.

She is married to Paul Schlacta and settled in California. The couple has no children.

Filmography

Tamil 

Vazhaiyadi Vazhai (1972) – Debut in Tamil
Arangetram (1973) as Lalitha
Komatha En Kulamatha (1973)
Malligai Poo  (1973)
Valli Dheivanai (1973)
Radha (1973)
Sondham (1973)
Manidharil Manikkam (1973)
Anbu Sagodharargal (1973)
Veetu Mappilai (1973)
Thanga Pathakkam (1974) as Jagan's wife
Thaai Paasam (1974)
Penn Ondru Kanden (1974)
Paruva Kaalam (1974)
Kai Niraya Kaasu (1974)
Piriya Vidai (1975)
Madhana Maaligai (1976)
Vayilla Poochi (1976)
Deviyin Thirumanam (1977)
Bala Paritchai (1977)
Punidha Anthoniyar (1977)
Unnai Suttrum Ulagam (1977)
Sadhurangam (1978)
Paavathin Sambalam (1978)
Thanga Rangan (1978)
Ullathil Kuzhanthaiyadi (1978)
Shri Kanchi Kamakshi (1978)
Makkal Kural (1978)
Kavari Maan (1979)
Devathai (1979)
Jaya Nee Jeichuttey (1979)
Vedhanai Thediya Maan (1980)
Ratha Paasam (1980)
47 Natkal (1983)
Villiyanur Matha (1983)
Soorakottai Singakutti (1983)
Rajathanthiram (1984)
Pournami Alaigal (1985)
Ketti Melam (1985)
Naam (1985)
Iravu Pookkal (1986)
Jallikattu (1987)
Kavalan Avan Kovalan (1987)
En Thangai Kalyani (1988)
Athaimadi Methaiadi (1989)
Muthalaliyamma (1990)

Malayalam 

Niyamam Yenthu Cheyyum (1990)
Akkare Akkare Akkare (1990) as Krishnan nairs wife
Shesham Screenil (1990)
Kali karyamaai: Crime Branch (1989) as Nurse Leelamma
Abkari (1988)
Mangalya Charthu (1987) as Susheela
Pidikittappulli (Kanan Pokunna Pooram)(1986)
Niramulla Raavukal (1986)
Oppam Oppathinoppam (1986) as Meenakshi
Janakeeya Kodathi (1985)
Puzhayozhukum Vazhi (1985) as Prameela
Ulppathi (1984)
Oru Nimisham Tharoo (1984)
Thacholi Thankappan (1984) as Janaki
Vetta (Kombu)(1984)
Sreekrishnaparunthu (1984)
Belt Mathai (1983) as Mary
Kattaruvi (1983) as Chellamma
Sooryan (1982)
Sphodanam (1981) as Narayanapilla's wife
Pathirasooryan (1981) as Ayisha
Aakramanam (1981)
Sambhavam (1981)
Ariyappedatha Rahasyam (1981) as Santha
Pinneyum Pookkunna Kaadu (1981)
Choothaattam (Ivide Jeevitham Aarambikkunnu)(1981)
Lava (1980) as Janaki
Kari Puranda Jeevithangal (1980)
Ithikkara Pakki (1980)
Aswaradham (1980) as Sreedevi Kunjamma
Vedikkettu(1980)
Prakadanam (1980) as Ammu
Karimbana(1980) as madamma
Saraswatheeyaamam (1980)
Ottappettavar(1979)
Ormayil Nee Matram (1979)
Lillyppookkal (1979)
Raathrikal Ninakku Vendi (1979)
Kallu Karthyaayani (1979)
Paapathinu Maranamilla (1979)
Vaaleduthavan Vaalaal (1979)
Driver Madhyapichirunnu (1979)
Aaravam (1978)
Thampuraatti (1978) as Ragini Thampuratti
Kudumbam Namukku Sreekovil (1978) as Parvathi
Thaalappoli (1977)
Amme Anupame (1977)
Yatheem (1977) as Jameela
Makam Piranna Manka (1977)
Angeekaaram (1977) as Malini
Maanasaveena (1976)
Ullaasayaathra (1975)
Bhaaryaye Aavashyamundu (Samarppanam)(1975)
Jesus (1973)
Sambhavami Yuge Yuge (1972) as Manju
Line Bus (1971) as Priyamma
Marunnattil Oru Malayalai (1971) as Shoshamma
Madhuvidhu (1970)
Inspector (1968)

Telugu 
Nijam Cheppithe Nammaru (1973)
Jeevitha Rangamu (1974)
Inti Kodalu (1974)
Asthi Kosam (1975)
Abhimanavathi (1975)
47 Rojulu (1981)
Palnati Puli (1984) as Parvathi
Prema Samrat (1987)
 Driver Babu (1986)

Kannada 
 Anna Attige (1974)
 Nagakanye (1975)
 Thayigintha Devarilla (1977)
 Parasangada Gendethimma (1978)
 Daaha (1979)
 Bhaktha Siriyala (1980)
 Bhaktha Gnanadeva (1982)
 Anveshane (1983)

Television 
 Vaishaka Sandhya – Malayalam serial

References

External links 

 Prameela at MSI

Actresses in Malayalam cinema
Indian film actresses
Actresses from Chennai
Actresses in Tamil cinema
20th-century Indian actresses
Living people
Actresses in Malayalam television
Date of birth missing (living people)
1949 births
Actresses in Telugu cinema
Actresses in Kannada cinema